Dan Romer is an American film composer, music producer and songwriter based in Los Angeles.

Career
As a film composer, Romer's scores include four-time Oscar-nominated Beasts of the Southern Wild, Beasts of No Nation, Chasing Coral, Gleason, The Good Doctor and the Emmy-winning Jim: The James Foley Story. His score for the HBO miniseries Station Eleven was also nominated for an Emmy in 2022. Romer scored the Ubisoft video game Far Cry 5 released on March 27, 2018.

He has produced music for numerous artists including A Great Big World and Christina Aguilera, whose single "Say Something," topped charts around the world, hit 6× Platinum, sold over seven million copies, and won a 2015 Grammy. Dan co-produced "Treat You Better" by Shawn Mendes which reached No. 1 on the iTunes chart and No. 3 on the US Top 40 pop radio charts in September 2016.  Romer composed the score to the Pixar animated feature film, Luca, which was the most-watched streaming film of 2021, with over 10.6 billion minutes watched. He worked with Justin Paul on the incidental underscore for Stephen Chbosky's 2021 film adaptation of Broadway musical Dear Evan Hansen.

Discography

As composer

Film

Television

Video games

Music producer

References

External links

Living people
Year of birth missing (living people)
21st-century American composers
21st-century American male musicians
American film score composers
American male film score composers
American television composers
Male television composers
Musicians from New York (state)
Record producers from New York (state)
Songwriters from New York (state)
State University of New York at Purchase alumni
American male songwriters